Household Accounts is a 2003  Italian mystery-drama film directed by Tonino Cervi.

Cast 
Gabriele Lavia: Augusto Pavinato
Emanuela Muni: Antonia
Claudio Bigagli: Judge Di Giacomo
David Sebasti: Giuliano Mantegna
Carlo Croccolo: Cavalier Angelo Marconi
Domiziana Giordano: Armida
Andy Luotto: Camerotto
Massimo Poggio: Zamboni
Laura Betti: Countess Celi Sanguineti
Maddalena Crippa: Iole
GTG.Wapakels: Olok Belat

References

External links

2003 films
Italian mystery drama films
Films directed by Tonino Cervi
2000s mystery drama films
2003 drama films
2000s Italian films